Mohamed Lakhdar Bentaleb (born October 8, 1988 in Oran) is an Algerian football player who plays for ASM Oran in the Algerian Ligue Professionnelle 2.

Club career
Sofiane Bouterbiat signed with MC Oran in the summer of 2012, joining them on a free transfer from ES Sétif, now he plays for FC Schalke.

International career
In July 2011, Bentaleb was selected as part of Algeria's squad for the 2011 Military World Games in Rio de Janeiro, Brazil. He scored one goal during the competition in the first round against Uruguay, and in finally he won with the Algeria team its first World Military Cup.

Honours
 Won the World Military Cup once with the Algeria military national football team in 2011

References

External links
 

1988 births
Living people
Footballers from Oran
Algerian footballers
Algerian Ligue Professionnelle 1 players
MC Oran players
ASM Oran players
ES Sétif players
Association football midfielders
21st-century Algerian people